Buckingham House (HBC) and Fort George (NWC) were two trading posts on the North Saskatchewan River near Elk Point, Alberta, from 1792 to 1800. Buckingham House belonged to the Hudson's Bay Company and Fort George to the North West Company. For background see Saskatchewan River fur trade.

Both posts were on a wooded north bank of the North Saskatchewan River. A gully and a few hundred yards separated them. From 1993 there was an interpretive center. To the north were the posts on the upper Beaver River (Canada).

Fort George
Faced with a declining supply of beaver and the increasing unrest of plains tribes at Pine Island Fort, the North West Company moved 120 miles upriver and established Fort George. It was one of the several places also known as, Fort des Prairies. Angus Shaw, who came south from Moose Lake (Alberta) was in charge for most of its history. Two of his clerks were Duncan McGillivray and John McDonald of Garth. Sixty to eighty men were there and an almost equal number of women and children. When news of the massacre at South Branch House reached them the men stayed inside the fort for six weeks and the men from Buckingham House moved into the NWC fort.  In 1794-96 it produced 325 bales of fur and 325 bags of pemmican. David Thompson (explorer) spent the winter of 1799 at the post and found it dilapidated. By 1800 the local beaver had declined so much that it was abandoned in favor of Fort de l'Isle 20 miles upriver. In 1809 Alexander Henry the younger salvaged what he could and took it downriver to Fort Vermilion.

Buckingham House
Following Angus Shaw, William Tomison of the Hudson's Bay Company arrived with 28 men in October 1792. At various times Peter Fidler, George Sutherland James Pruden and Henry Hallet were in charge. It always had fewer men and less trade goods than its rival. Relations between the two posts were usually difficult but correct. During a drought the HBC tried to deny the NWC access to the HBC well. Access was restored when John McDonald of Garth told Tomison that either one or the other of them would visit the bottom of the well.  Buckingham House was abandoned in 1800. By that time, Fort Edmonton and other forts had been built upriver from that site.

See also
Saskatchewan River fur trade

References

Further reading

External links 

Location:

Hudson's Bay Company trading posts
North West Company forts
North Saskatchewan River
History of Alberta
Provincial Historic Resources of Alberta